The 2014 PEI Tankard, the provincial men's curling championship for Prince Edward Island,  was held from February 5 to 9 at the Montague Curling Rink in Montague, Prince Edward Island. The winning Eddie MacKenzie rink from Charlottetown represented Prince Edward Island at the 2014 Tim Hortons Brier in Kamloops.

Teams

Knockout Draw Brackets

A Event

B Event

C Event

Playoffs

1 vs. 2
Saturday, February 8, 7:00 pm

3 vs. 4
Saturday, February 8, 7:00 pm

Semifinal
Sunday, February 9, 2:00 pm

Final
Sunday, February 9, 7:00 pm

External links

2014 Tim Hortons Brier
Curling competitions in Prince Edward Island
Montague, Prince Edward Island
2014 in Prince Edward Island